Nordhavnen, or Nordhavn, is a harbour area at the coast of the Øresund, founded at the end of the 19th century in Copenhagen, Denmark. It covers an area of more than 2 km².

Today, most of Copenhagen Harbour's traditional activities are situated in Nordhavn, including ferry berths, a container terminal, marina, and industrial companies.

The S-train station Nordhavn station is located at Nordhavnen close to the city district Østerbro.

Expansion of Nordhavn 

The agency By og Havn has started the 668 million DKK expansion of Nordhavn into Øresund. The project is the largest construction job in Denmark in 2013 and the largest consumer of steel in Northern Europe; 28,000 tonnes of steel is used for pile driving the sheet piles of the perimeter, and the area is being filled with 7 million tonnes of clean earth and 11 million tonnes of polluted earth from the City Circle Line metro and other projects until around year 2022-2025. The City Circle Line is extending into Nordhavn with at least one station.
The cruise ship quay is 1,100m long with 3 passenger terminals.

The agency By og Havn has proposed plans to develop Nordhavn as a new city district that would have 40,000 residents and 40,000 jobs. The proposed district will be about six times larger than Indre Østerbro.

The Municipality of Copenhagen plans to build 400,000 m² for residence and industry around Århusgade from 2008 onwards, and additional 200,000 m² at Kalkbrænderiløbet from 2015. The area is expected to be fully developed within 20–25 years and partially finances the expansion of the Copenhagen Metro.

In 2013, the United Nations campus UN City opened at the eastern part of Marmormolen in the Nordhavn area. The 45,000 m² project will include most of the present UN activities in Copenhagen.

Cultural references
Skudehavnsvej in Nordhavn is used as a location at (0:37:24 and 0:47:14 in the 1977 Olsen-banden film The Olsen Gang Outta Sight.

See also
 Pakhus 48
 Portland Towers
 The Silo

External links
 Construction photos
 Aerial photos

References

 
Copenhagen city districts
Port of Copenhagen